Metropolitan Parkway may refer to:

Metropolitan Parkway (Atlanta), Georgia, United States
Metropolitan Parkway (Detroit area), Michigan, United States

See also
Metropolitan Boulevard (disambiguation)